There are several trails in the United States named Legacy Trail. They are the following:

 Legacy Trail (Florida), in Sarasota County, Florida
 Legacy Trail (Kentucky), in Lexington, Kentucky
 Legacy Trail (Oklahoma), in Norman, Oklahoma
 Legacy Trail (Texas), in Plano, Texas